Lilongwe is a district in the Central Region of Malawi. The capital is Lilongwe.

Lilongwe was officially declared a township in 1947. Life President Ngwazi Hastings Kamuzu Banda declared Lilongwe the capital city of Malawi on January 1, 1975 after a ten-year building period during which many people were forcibly displaced to make way for the new government buildings. Prior to 1975, the capital was the much smaller southern city of Zomba.

The airport is very small but quite adequate. It is served by Kenya Airways out of Nairobi, South African Airways, proflight, Fastjet and Ethiopian Airways. In 2014 the government of Malawi relaunched its national airline and flies regionally to destinations like Dar es Salaam and Lusaka

Demographics
At the time of the 2018 Census of Malawi, the distribution of the population of Lilongwe District by ethnic group was as follows:
 80.5% Chewa
 10.4% Tumbuka
 4.5% Yao
 2.1% Ngoni
 2.0% Lomwe
 0.1% Sena
 0.1% Mang'anja
 0.1% Tonga
 0.0% Nyanja
 0.0% Nkhonde
 0.0% Lambya
 0.0% Sukwa
 0.1% Others

Government and administrative divisions

There are twenty-two National Assembly constituencies in Lilongwe:

 Lilongwe - Central
 Lilongwe - City Central
 Lilongwe - City North
 Lilongwe - City South-East
 Lilongwe - City South-West
 Lilongwe - City West
 Lilongwe - East
 Lilongwe - Kumachenga
 Lilongwe - Mapuyu North
 Lilongwe - Mapuyu South
 Lilongwe - Mpenu
 Lilongwe - Mpenu Nkhoma
 Lilongwe - Msinja North
 Lilongwe - Msinja South
 Lilongwe - Msozi North
 Lilongwe - Msozi South
 Lilongwe - North
 Lilongwe - North East
 Lilongwe - North West
 Lilongwe - South
 Lilongwe - South East
 Lilongwe - South West

Since the 2009 election all of these constituencies have been held by members of the Malawi Congress Party.

References

 
Districts of Malawi
Districts in Central Region, Malawi